The 2022 Sicilian regional election for the renewal of the Sicilian Regional Assembly and the election of the President of Sicily were held on 25 September, 2022. Renato Schifani, candidate of the centre-right coalition, easily won the election, becoming the next president of the region.

Electoral system
The Sicilian Parliament is elected with a mixed system: 62 MPs are chosen with a form of proportional representation using a largest remainder method with open lists and a 5% threshold, while 8 MPs (7+1) are elected using Party bloc vote.

Background

Progressive camp primary election
On 18 June a press conference was held between the leaders of Democratic Party, Five Star Movement, Italian Left, Green Europe, Article One, Italian Socialist Party and One Hundred Steps for Sicily. They presented the guidelines for the Progressive camp primary election, which was held on 23 July. The deadline for the candidacies was set for June 30. Caterina Chinnici won the primary election with 44% of votes, ahead of Barbara Floridia (32%) and Claudio Fava (23%).

Parties and candidates
Below is a list of the parties and their respective leaders in the election.

Opinion polling

Candidates

Hypothetical candidates

Parties

Results

References

2022 elections in Italy
Elections in Sicily